Julie Bergan (born 12 April 1994) is a Norwegian singer and songwriter born in Skien, Norway. Bergan started releasing covers on YouTube at the age of 16, eventually signing a record deal with Warner Music Norway in 2013. In 2015 she attained mainstream success with her single All Hours, crossing borders to Denmark and Germany, before breaking though in her native Norway in 2016 with Arigato peaking at number one. Bergans major-label debut album Turn on the Light was released in 2018. She returned to the number one spot in 2018 on VG-lista after collaborating with K-391, Alan Walker and Seungri on "Ignite".

Career 
In 2012 she recorded the song "Supernova" with Cir.Cuz, which peaked at number five on the Norwegian Singles Chart.
She participated in Melodi Grand Prix 2013, the national selection for the Eurovision Song Contest 2013 with the song "Give a Little Something Back", which she wrote with Ben Adams and Sara Skjoldnes. She did not qualify from the semi-final in Steinkjer. In September 2013, she was signed by Warner Music Norway. In early 2014, she released her first single, "Younger".

After the release of her single she wrote and release a number of songs, but it was first after the release of her single "Arigato" she became known beyond national borders. The song reached number five in the Swedish singles chart, and was nominated at the Norwegian Grammys in 2016 for Song of the Year. 13th January 2017 she released second single from her debutant album "Blackout". 9th June 2017 she released her third single "If You Love Me" featuring american rapper Tunji Ige and 5th November 2017 her fourth single "Incapable". 26th January 2018 she released her fifth single "Guilt Trip". 2 February she released her debutant album "Turn On The Lights". The album reached number one on Norwegian chart VG-Lista. In March  she went on a concert tour called "It's Lit Tour pt. I" across Norway. 11th May Alan Walker and K-391 released single "Ignite" featuring Julie Bergan and Seungri and peaked no.1 at Norwegian Charts VG-Lista and thirteen at Swedish singles chart. She performed with Alan Walker on Coachella as a guest and EDC Japan Festival also as a guest on Alan Walker's show. In summer she went on her third tour "It's Lit Tour pt. II" in Norway, UK, France and Sweden. She played on festivals in Norway and Sweden and in clubs in London and Paris. In the end of 2018 she released single "U Got Me".

Personal life 
Julie Bergan has a sister named Veronica.

Discography

Albums

Extended plays

Singles

As lead artist

As featured artist

Covers 
 Undressed - cover with Astrid S (2013)
Rude - (2014)

Awards and nominations

Concert tours 
Headlining
 Arigato Tour (2016)
 It's Lit Tour - Part I (2018)
 It's Lit Tour - Part II (2018)
 Hard Feelings Tour (2019-2020)

Supporting
 Purpose World Tour (2016)
 The Self-Titled Tour (2018)
 Avation Tour (2018)

Notes

References

External links 
 

1994 births
Living people
Norwegian pop singers
Musicians from Skien
English-language singers from Norway
Norwegian singer-songwriters
Melodi Grand Prix contestants
21st-century Norwegian singers
21st-century Norwegian women singers